The 2001 Men's Hockey Champions Trophy was the 23rd edition of the Hockey Champions Trophy men's field hockey tournament. It was reorganised to take place in Rotterdam, Netherlands on the scheduled dates of 3–11 November 2001. The event will take place at HC Rotterdam’s brand new NLG 24 million, 8,000-seating facility, which opened in August and was the first world level event at the venue.

Squads

Head Coach: Barry Dancer

Head Coach: Bernhard Peters

Results

Pool

Classification

Fifth and sixth place

Third and fourth place

Final

Awards

Final standings

External links
Official FIH website

C
C
Champions Trophy (field hockey)
2001